Schneidereit is a German surname. Notable people with the surname include:

Alfred Schneidereit (1919–1999), German SS officer
Heinrich Schneidereit (1884–1915), German Olympic weightlifter

German-language surnames